HMS Minerva was one of the four 32-gun  fifth-rate frigates of the Royal Navy.  She was launched in 1759 and served through the Seven Years' War, but was captured in 1778 during the American Revolutionary War and served as the French Minerve until being recaptured in 1781 and renamed HMS Recovery. She was broken up in 1784.

Service history

British career 
The frigate was built at Rotherhithe between 1756 and 1759 and was commissioned into the Royal Navy as HMS Minerva during the Seven Years' War. Under the command of Captain Alexander Hood, she took part in the Battle of Quiberon Bay on 20 November 1759.

Minerva gave chase and finally caught her at 10.20 a.m. During a brisk engagement lasting no more than 40 minutes the enemy ship lost her main and fore top-mast, while soon after Minerva lost her bowsprit and fore-mast. Both ships were obliged to break off the action to clear the wreckage, but Minerva was ready to resume the fight first and closed with the enemy again at 4 p.m., forcing her to strike her colours after an hour. She proved to be the French ship Warwick (formerly , captured in 1756), a 60-gun ship, but armed en flûte with only 34 guns, under the command M. le Vegerde Belair. She had sailed from Rochfort on 20 January, bound for the Isle de France (now Mauritius) loaded with provisions, ammunition, and stores, and also transporting a detachment of 74 soldiers and six other passengers. Warwick had 14 killed and 32 wounded, while aboard Minerve 14 were killed, and 34 wounded, three of whom later died.

Prize money for Warwick was paid from 19 July 1762 at Portsmouth.

During the American Revolutionary War Minerva was part of the West Indies Squadron under Admiral Peter Parker. On 14 August 1778 she captured the American 50-ton schooner Fanny off Hispaniola, sailing from Connecticut with a cargo of timber.

On 22 August 1778, Minerva, under the command of Captain John Stott, and unaware that France had declared war on Britain met the French 32-gun frigate Concorde, under Capitaine Le Gardeur de Tilly. Stott, mistaking her for a harmless merchantman, approached to speak to her, but Concorde fired two broadsides into her before Minerva could reply. The British were caught off guard, and suffered further misfortune when a powder explosion under the half-deck dismounted three guns, and killed or wounded eighteen men. Captain Stott was also severely wounded in the head and was carried below. After two and a half hours, Minerva surrendered, her mizzen-mast having gone overboard and her other masts tottering, her wheel destroyed, and having lost her Captain and First Lieutenant.

French career 
She was commissioned into the French Navy as Minerve, and commanded by Nicolas Henri de Grimouard. The 74-gun  and  recaptured her in the action of 4 January 1781.

Second British career 
The Royal Navy recommissioned her under the name HMS Recovery, as another  had been commissioned after she was lost. She was laid up in 1783 and sold the following year.

Citations and references
Citations

References
 Robert Gardiner, The First Frigates, Conway Maritime Press, London 1992. .
 David Lyon, The Sailing Navy List, Conway Maritime Press, London 1993. .
 Rif Winfield, British Warships in the Age of Sail, 1714 to 1792, Seaforth Publishing, London 2007. .
 

1759 ships
Ships built in Deptford
Fifth-rate frigates of the Royal Navy